Hollowiella amasonca is a moth in the family Cossidae. It was described by Yakovlev in 2006. It is found in the Philippines (Palawan).

Description
The length of the forewings measures 14–17 mm across.

References

Natural History Museum Lepidoptera generic names catalog

Cossinae
Moths described in 2006
Moths of Asia